is a Grand Prix motorcycle racer from Japan. He currently races in the Asia Road Racing SS600 Championship and the All Japan Road Race J-GP2 Championship aboard a Yamaha YZF-R6. He has also competed in the MFJ All Japan JSB1000 Championship, the MFJ All Japan Road Race GP250 Championship, and the East Japan GP250 Challenge Cup, which he was champion of in 2007.

Career statistics
2006- 19th, All Japan Road Race Championship GP250 #76    Yamaha TZR250
2007- 12th, All Japan Road Race Championship GP250 #19    Yamaha TZR250 / 1st, East Japan GP250 Challenge Cup #76    Yamaha TZR250
2008- 9th, All Japan Road Race Championship GP250 #12    Yamaha TZR250
2010- All Japan Road Race Championship ST600 #76    Yamaha YZF-R6
2011- 19th, All Japan Road Race Championship ST600 #76    Yamaha YZF-R6
2012- 10th, All Japan Road Race Championship ST600 #19    Yamaha YZF-R6 / 5th, Asia Road Race Championship SS600 #19    Yamaha YZF-R6
2013- 11th, All Japan Road Race Championship ST600 #76    Yamaha YZF-R6 / 4th, Asia Road Race Championship SS600 #76    Yamaha YZF-R6
2014- 8th, All Japan Road Race Championship ST600 #76    Yamaha YZF-R6 / 2nd, Asia Road Race Championship SS600 #76    Yamaha YZF-R6
2015- 16th, All Japan Road Race Championship JSB1000 #41    Yamaha YZF-R1 / 4th, Asia Road Race Championship SS600 #76    Yamaha YZF-R6
2016- 13th, Asia Road Race Championship SS600 #76    Yamaha YZF-R6
2017- 4th, Asia Road Race Championship SS600 #76    Yamaha YZF-R6
2018- All Japan Road Race J-GP2 Championship #25 / Asia Road Race Championship SS600 #76    Yamaha YZF-R6

By season

Races by year
(key)

Asia Superbike 1000

Races by year
(key) (Races in bold indicate pole position; races in italics indicate fastest lap)

References

External links
 Profile on motogp.com

Japanese motorcycle racers
Living people
1991 births
250cc World Championship riders